Wamalchitamia is a genus of Mesoamerican flowering plants in the family Asteraceae.

 Species
 Wamalchitamia appressipila (S.F.Blake) Strother - Chiapas
 Wamalchitamia aurantiaca (Klatt) Strother - Chiapas, Oaxaca, Guatemala, Honduras, Nicaragua, Costa Rica
 Wamalchitamia dionysi Strother - Chiapas
 Wamalchitamia strigosa (DC.) Strother - Chiapas, Oaxaca
 Wamalchitamia williamsii (Standl. & Steyerm.) Strother - Honduras, Nicaragua

References

Flora of Mexico
Asteraceae genera
Heliantheae
Flora of Central America